HMAS Parkes (J361), named for the town of Parkes, New South Wales, was one of 60 Bathurst-class corvettes constructed in Australia during World War II, and one of 36 initially manned and commissioned by the Royal Australian Navy (RAN).

Design and construction

In 1938, the Australian Commonwealth Naval Board (ACNB) identified the need for a general purpose 'local defence vessel' capable of both anti-submarine and mine-warfare duties, while easy to construct and operate. Construction of the prototype  did not go ahead, but the plans were retained. The need for locally built 'all-rounder' vessels at the start of World War II saw the "Australian Minesweepers" (designated as such to hide their anti-submarine capability, but popularly referred to as "corvettes") approved in September 1939, with 60 constructed during the course of the war: 36 (including Parkes) ordered by the RAN, 20 ordered by the British Admiralty but manned and commissioned as RAN vessels, and 4 for the Royal Indian Navy.

Parkes was laid down by Evans Deakin and Company at Brisbane on 16 March 1943. She was launched on 30 October 1943 by Mrs Brown, wife of the President of the Senate, and commissioned into the RAN on 25 May 1944. The ship was originally to be named Mudgee, for the town of Mudgee, New South Wales.

Operational history
The corvette earned two battle honours for her wartimes service: "Pacific 1944" and "New Guinea 1944".

Fate
Parkes paid off to reserve on 17 December 1945 in Fremantle, Western Australia. The vessel was sold for scrap to Hong Kong Rolling Mills Ltd on 2 May 1957.

Citations

References
Books

Journal and news articles

Bathurst-class corvettes of the Royal Australian Navy
Ships built in Queensland
1943 ships
World War II corvettes of Australia